The Temple of Fortuna Respiciens (Latin: vicus Fortunae Respicientis) was a temple in ancient Rome, sited on the western slopes of the Palatine Hill. It is mentioned in the 4th century Regional Catalogues. The only surviving part of its structure is a polychrome pediment discovered on via di San Gregorio in the Neronian fire layer and now in the Capitoline Museums

See also
List of Ancient Roman temples

References

http://penelope.uchicago.edu/Thayer/E/Gazetteer/Places/Europe/Italy/Lazio/Roma/Rome/_Texts/PLATOP*/Aedes_Fortunae.html

Fortuna Respiciens
Temples of Fortuna